Darayya District is a district of the Rif Dimashq Governorate in southern Syria. The administrative centre is the city of Darayya. At the 2004 census, the district had a population of 260,961.

Sub-districts
The district of Darayya is divided into three sub-districts or nawāḥī (population as of 2004):

Localities in Darayya District
According to the Central Bureau of Statistics (CBS), the following villages, towns and cities make up the district of Darayya:

References

 

 
Districts of Rif Dimashq Governorate